Home Stuff is a 1921 American silent comedy film directed by Albert H. Kelley and starring Viola Dana, Tom Gallery and Josephine Crowell.

Cast
 Viola Dana as Madge Joy
 Tom Gallery as Robert Deep
 Josephine Crowell as 'Ma' Deep
 Nelson McDowell as 'Pa' Deep
 Priscilla Bonner as Susan Deep
 James Robert Chandler as Mr. 'Pat' 
 Aileen Manning as Mrs. 'Pat'
 Philip Sleeman as Jim Sackett

References

Bibliography
 Munden, Kenneth White. The American Film Institute Catalog of Motion Pictures Produced in the United States, Part 1. University of California Press, 1997.

External links
 

1921 films
1921 comedy films
1920s English-language films
American silent feature films
Silent American comedy films
American black-and-white films
Films directed by Albert H. Kelley
Metro Pictures films
1920s American films